Antonio Jesús Cotán Pérez (born 19 September 1995) is a Spanish professional footballer who plays as a central midfielder for CD Numancia.

Club career

Sevilla
Born in Olivares, Province of Seville, Andalusia, Cotán came through the youth ranks at local club Sevilla FC, spending his first season as a senior with the reserves in the Segunda División B. On 9 January 2013 he first appeared with the first team, against RCD Mallorca for that season's Copa del Rey, but did not leave the bench in the 1–2 home loss.

On 8 August 2013, one month shy of his 18th birthday, Cotán made his first official appearance with the Andalusians, playing the entire second half in a 6–1 away win over FK Mladost Podgorica in the third qualifying round of the UEFA Europa League. On 11 May of the following year, as the main squad had already secured the fifth place and manager Unai Emery was resting his starters for the Europa League final, he made his La Liga debut, featuring the full 90 minutes in a 1–0 defeat at Getafe CF.

Cotán subsequently featured almost exclusively for the B side the following years, helping them in their promotion to Segunda División in 2016. He scored his first professional goal on 21 August of that year, netting the first in a 3–3 home draw against Girona FC.

Valladolid
On 8 August 2017, Cotán signed a two-year contract with fellow second-division club Real Valladolid, with Sevilla holding a buyback clause. He featured rarely during the campaign due to injury, in a promotion in the playoffs.

Cotán left the Estadio José Zorrilla as a free agent on 30 January 2019, having failed to appear in any league matches in the season.

Gimnàstic
On 31 January 2019, Cotán agreed to a six-month deal at Gimnàstic de Tarragona of the second tier. He was used sparingly in his short spell, in an eventual relegation.

Roda and Numancia
On 25 July 2019, Cotán moved abroad for the first time in his career and joined Roda JC Kerkrade of the Dutch Eerste Divisie. On 2 September of the following year, he returned to his home nation after signing for CD Numancia, recently relegated to division three.

Career statistics

Club

References

External links

1995 births
Living people
People from Aljarafe
Sportspeople from the Province of Seville
Spanish footballers
Footballers from Andalusia
Association football midfielders
La Liga players
Segunda División players
Segunda División B players
Segunda Federación players
Sevilla Atlético players
Sevilla FC players
Real Valladolid players
Gimnàstic de Tarragona footballers
CD Numancia players
Eerste Divisie players
Roda JC Kerkrade players
Spain youth international footballers
Spanish expatriate footballers
Expatriate footballers in the Netherlands
Spanish expatriate sportspeople in the Netherlands